Pertevniyal Spor Kulübü, more commonly known as Pertevniyal, is a Turkish professional basketball club that is based in Istanbul, and which plays in the Turkish 2nd-tier level Turkish Basketball League (TBL). The club's home arena is Ahmet Cömert Sport Hall, which has a capacity of 3,500 seats.

History
Pertevniyal was founded by Pertevniyal High School's teachers and students in 1968. Pertevniyal was the feeder club of Anadolu Efes through the year 2016.

Notable players
  Ahmet Düverioğlu
 Aloysius Anagonye
 Barış Hersek
  Bora Hun Paçun
 Can Korkmaz
 Cedi Osman
  Dušan Cantekin
 Ege Arar
 Emircan Koşut
 Emre Bayav
 Erkan Veyseloğlu
 Furkan Korkmaz
 Melih Mahmutoğlu
 Okben Ulubay
 Orhan Hacıyeva

See also 
 Anadolu Efes
 Pertevniyal High School
 Turkish Basketball League (TBL)

External links 
 Anadolu Efes Spor Kulübü-Pertevniyal Official website 
 Eurobasket.com Club Profile

Basketball teams in Turkey
Basketball teams established in 1968
Sport in Istanbul